

Martin Bieber (10 November 1900  – 19 October 1974) was a German general in the Wehrmacht of Nazi Germany during World War II who commanded  several divisions. Born in Tabarz, he was a recipient of the  Knight's Cross of the Iron Cross with Oak Leaves, Bieber surrendered to the Soviet forces in May 1945 and was held in the Soviet Union as a war criminal until October 1955. He died in Düsseldorf in 1974.

Awards and decorations
 Iron Cross (1914) 2nd Class (4 November 1917) & 1st Class (22 September 1918)
 Honour Cross of the World War 1914/1918 (23 January 1935)
 Wehrmacht Long Service Award 4th Class (2 October 1936)
 West Wall Medal (20 April 1940)
 Clasp to the Iron Cross (1939) 2nd Class (10 June 1940) & 1st Class  (24 June 1940)
 Wound Badge (1939) in Silver (15 February 1942)
 Eastern Front Medal (18 August 1942)
 German Cross in Gold on 2 January 1942 as Major in II./Infanterie-Regiment 167
 Knight's Cross of the Iron Cross with Oak Leaves
 Knight's Cross on 28 July 1943 as Oberst and commander of Grenadier-Regiment 184
 Oak Leaves on 2 September 1944 as Oberst and commander of Divisionsgruppe 86

References

Citations

Bibliography

 
 
 
 

1900 births
1974 deaths
People from Saxe-Coburg and Gotha
People from Gotha (district)
Major generals of the German Army (Wehrmacht)
German Army personnel of World War I
Recipients of the clasp to the Iron Cross, 1st class
Recipients of the Gold German Cross
Recipients of the Knight's Cross of the Iron Cross with Oak Leaves
Military personnel from Thuringia
German Army generals of World War II